Forkhead box protein K1 is a transcription factor of the forkhead box family that in humans is encoded by the FOXK1 gene.

During starvation, in type 2 diabetes, in rapidly dividing cells during embryogenesis, in tumors (Warburg effect) and during T cell proliferation, aerobic glycolysis is induced to produce the building block to sustain growth. FOXK1 is one of the transcription factors managing the passage from the normal cellular respiration (complete glucose oxidation) to generating ATP and intermediaries for many other biochemical pathways.

FOXK1 and its closely relate sibling FOXK2 induce aerobic glycolysis by upregulating the enzymatic machinery required for this (for example, hexokinase-2, phosphofructokinase, pyruvate kinase, and lactate dehydrogenase), while at the same time suppressing further oxidation of pyruvate in the mitochondria by increasing the activity of pyruvate dehydrogenase kinases 1 and 4. Together with suppression of the catalytic subunit of pyruvate dehydrogenase phosphatase 1 this leads to increased phosphorylation of the E1α regulatory subunit of the pyruvate dehydrogenase complex, which in turn inhibits further oxidation of pyruvate in the mitochondria—instead, pyruvate is reduced to lactate. Suppression of FOXK1 and FOXK2 induce the opposite phenotype. Both in vitro and in vivo experiments, including studies of primary human cells, show how FOXK1 and/or FOXK2 are likely to act as important regulators that reprogram cellular metabolism to induce aerobic glycolysis.

References

Further reading

Forkhead transcription factors